Kinminity is a former village located south-east of Birse, Aberdeenshire in Scotland.

History
The property was in hands of the cadet family of Sutherlands of Kinminitie, from the Sutherland of Duffus family in the 16th century. The manor house was in ruins by the 18th century. Kinminity Farm is located nearby.

Notes

References

Clan Sutherland
Aberdeenshire